Frank John Fenner  (21 December 1914 – 22 November 2010) was an Australian scientist with a distinguished career in the field of virology. His two greatest achievements are cited as overseeing the eradication of smallpox, and the attempted control of Australia's rabbit plague through the introduction of Myxoma virus.

The Australian Academy of Science awards annually the prestigious Fenner Medal for distinguished research in biology by a scientist under 40 years of age.

Early life and education
Frank Johannes Fenner was born in Ballarat in 1914. The family moved to Adelaide, South Australia in November 1916. He attended Rose Park Primary School and Thebarton Technical School. He attended the University of Adelaide, where he earned degrees in medicine and surgery in 1938. That year, uneasy about Hitler's rise, he legally changed his middle name to John.

Career
In May 1937, Fenner was a member of an Adelaide University anthropological expedition to Nepabunna Mission in the northern Flinders Ranges in South Australia led by J.B. Cleland, which also included Charles P. Mountford as ethnologist and photographer, as well as botanist Thomas Harvey Johnston, and others.

From 1940 to 1946 he was a Captain and Major in the Australian Army Medical Corps with service in Australia, Palestine, Egypt, New Guinea, and Borneo, as medical officer in field ambulance and Casualty Clearing Station, pathologist to general hospital, and malariologist. For his work in combating malaria in Papua New Guinea he was made a Member of the Order of the British Empire in 1945.

Following his war-time service he was recruited by Frank Macfarlane Burnet to work at the Walter and Eliza Hall Institute of Medical Research in Melbourne. Initially they worked on smallpox in mice, for which he coined the term "mousepox", and later on the genetics of poxvirus.

In 1949, he received a fellowship to study at the Rockefeller Institute for Medical Research in New York City, he worked on mycobacterium Bairnsdale bacillus, which causes Buruli ulcer, the third most important mycobacterial disease worldwide after tuberculosis and leprosy. Here he worked with and was influenced by René Dubos, who is one of the claimed originators of the phrase "Think Globally, Act Locally".

In Canberra, 1949–2010
Returning to Australia in 1949, he was appointed Professor of Microbiology at the new John Curtin School of Medical Research at the Australian National University, Canberra. Here he began studying viruses again, in particular the myxoma virus.

Throughout the 1940s and 1950s Australia had severe rabbit plagues. Fenner's work on the myxoma virus showed that initially it killed rabbits in 9 to 11 days and was 99.5% lethal. Under heavy selection pressure, the few rabbits that survived developed resistance, which meant that the pest was never completely eradicated, but their numbers were reduced. Prior to the release of the virus as a biological control for the rabbits, Fenner, Frank Macfarlane Burnet, and Ian Clunies Ross famously injected themselves with myxoma virus, to prove it was not dangerous for humans.

From 1967 to 1973 Fenner was Director of the John Curtin School of Medical Research. In 1977, he was named the chairman of the Global Commission for the Certification of Smallpox Eradication, the same year the last known case of naturally transmitted smallpox occurred in Somalia. Fenner announced the eradication of smallpox to the World Health Assembly on 8 May 1980. This success story is regarded as the greatest achievement of the World Health Organization. Before its eradication, smallpox was one of the world's most virulent viruses, responsible for millions of deaths, and leaving many of the victims who survived with disfiguring scars for life.

Fenner had an abiding interest in the environment, and was the foundation Director of the Centre for Resources and Environmental Studies at the ANU (1973), where he worked until his retirement in 1979, and which became part of the Fenner School of Environment and Society in 2007. He was a keen supporter of Australia having an ecologically, socially sustainable population. He was Emeritus Professor at the John Curtin School of Medical Research.

In June 2010, he predicted in an interview with The Australian the extinction of the human race within a century, primarily as the result of human overpopulation, environmental degradation and climate change.

He died in Canberra on the morning of 22 November 2010 after a brief illness, and days after the birth of his first great-grandchild.

Personal life
In 1944 Fenner met Bobbie Roberts. Ellen Margaret 'Bobbie' Roberts was a trained midwife and nurse. During World War II she worked on malaria with the Australian Army Nursing Service and through her work met Fenner. Shortly after they met they married in a Catholic ceremony (despite Fenner being an atheist). While keen to have children, the couple were infertile and with Bobbie having a hysterectomy in 1949 they decided to adopt. They subsequently adopted two children. Marilyn Aldus Fenner was born on 27 June 1950. Her biological parents were unknown. Victoria Fenner (born 1 March 1943) was adopted later at the request of her father (Fenner's younger brother Tom) after the death in a fire of Victoria's mother (Beverley Slaney).

On 30 March 1958, Victoria Fenner shot and killed herself, with the assistance of another child, Catherine Webb. The coronial inquiry heard she had been passing through a period of extreme mental and spiritual disturbance and the coroner declared her death a suicide. Fenner himself was unable to fathom a motive, other than she was upset from reading Neville Shute's book, On the Beach.

Bobbie Fenner was diagnosed with cancer in 1989 and eventually died in 1994. Marilyn Fenner and her family then moved into the family home and looked after her father until his death.

Publications
 Frank Fenner and Francis Ratcliffe, Myxmatosis. Cambridge University Press, 1965.

Honours
Of the many honours Professor Fenner received throughout his career, there are the following:
 Member of the Order of the British Empire (MBE), 19 July 1945
 Companion of the Order of St Michael and St George (CMG) 12 June 1976, in recognition of service to medical research
 The Macfarlane Burnet Medal and Lecture of the Australian Academy of Science, 1985
 The Japan Prize (Preventive Medicine), 1988 (with Donald Henderson and Isao Arita)
 Companion of the Order of Australia (AC) 26 January 1989, in recognition of service to medical science, to public health and to the environment
 Copley medal of the Royal Society, 1995
 Albert Einstein World Award of Science, 2000
 Clunies Ross Lifetime Contribution National Science and Technology Award, 2002
 Both the Frank Fenner building which houses the ANU Medical School and Faculty of Science, and a residential college Fenner Hall are named in honour of Frank Fenner.
 WHO Medal
 Mueller Medal (1964) and ANZAAS Medal (1980)
 ANZAC Peace Prize
 Matthew Flinders Medal and Lecture, 1967
 Britannica Australia Award for Medicine
 2002 Prime Minister's Prize for Science
 ACT Senior Australian of the Year 2005
 The federal Division of Fraser, named for Jim Fraser, was renamed after Frank Fenner for the 2016 general election. This was due to the AEC's plans to name a seat in Victoria in honour of deceased Prime Minister Malcolm Fraser.

References

External links
 Online Guide to Records at the South Australian Museum Archives
 Australian Academy of Science—Interview with Professor Frank Fenner
 EmerProfessor Frank Fenner's Webpage at JCMSR
 Australian War Memorial Honours and Awards Database
  Originally published in Historical Records of Australian Science, vol.24, no.1, pp. 109–133, 2013.

1914 births
2010 deaths
Albert Einstein World Award of Science Laureates
Australian virologists
Australian microbiologists
Smallpox eradication
Fellows of the Australian Academy of Science
Australian atheists
Fellows of the Royal Society
Foreign associates of the National Academy of Sciences
Companions of the Order of Australia
Australian Companions of the Order of St Michael and St George
Australian Members of the Order of the British Empire
Recipients of the Copley Medal
People from Ballarat
WEHI alumni